Lily Delissa Joseph, née Solomon, (24 June 1863 – 27 July 1940) was a British artist and social campaigner active in the English suffrage movement.

Biography
Joseph was born in Bermondsey in London into a wealthy, cultured Jewish family. Her elder brother was the artist Solomon Joseph Solomon, and Flora Lion would be a cousin. Joseph attended the Ridley School of Art and the Royal College of Art in London. She painted portraits, interiors and urban landscapes in a style clearly influenced by Impressionism but often with a limited palette.

Joseph was also an activist in both the women's suffrage movement and in support of Jewish charities. She was among the founders of the Ladies' Guild at the Hammersmith Synagogue in west London and also ran reading rooms in the Whitechapel area. After meeting Isaac Rosenberg in 1911, she briefly employed him as a tutor for her children and later helped pay for his studies at the Slade School of Art. Joseph was arrested at least once during the women's suffrage campaign. When her 1912 exhibition at the Baille Gallery, Some London and Country Interiors, was reviewed in the Jewish Chronicle a notice appeared on the same page apologising for her absence from the show's Private View reception on the grounds that "she was detained at Holloway Goal in connection with the Women's Suffrage Movement". Joseph was a keen cyclist, an early pilot and also a motorist, travelling to Palestine by car in the 1920s.

In 1924, Joseph and her architect husband held a joint exhibition of drawings and paintings at the Suffolk Street Galleries. Throughout her life Joseph was a regular exhibitor at the Royal Academy, showing some twenty-five paintings between 1904 and 1938. She also exhibited with the Society of Women Artists, the New English Art Club and the Royal Society of British Artists. Joseph exhibited at the Paris Salon receiving an Honourable Mention on one occasion and in 1929 winning a silver medal. In 1946 the Ben Uri Gallery in London had a joint exhibition of works by Joseph and her brother Solomom and examples of her paintings were included in the Jewish Art of Great Britain 1845–1945 exhibition held at the Belgrave Gallery in 1978. The Ben Uri Gallery holds her Self-Portrait with Candles which shows Joseph holding two Sabbath candles and with her head covered observing the Jewish Sabbath. The Tate collection includes a 1937 London scene by Joseph, Roofs, High Holborn, showing the view from her studio towards the Old Bailey.

Joseph lived at Birchington in Kent for a time. She died on 27 July 1940 and is buried at Willesden Jewish Cemetery.

References

External links

3 artworks by Lily Delissa Joseph at the Ben Uri site

1863 births
1940 deaths
Place of death missing
19th-century English painters
19th-century English women artists
20th-century English painters
20th-century English women artists
Alumni of the Royal College of Art
Artists from London
Burials at Willesden Jewish Cemetery
English Jews
English portrait painters
English suffragists
English women painters
Jewish activists
Jewish suffragists
Jewish women painters
Jewish painters
People from Bermondsey
People from Birchington-on-Sea
Sibling artists